The 2001–02 Heineken Cup was the seventh edition of the Heineken Cup. Competing teams from France, Ireland, Italy, Wales, England and Scotland, were divided into six pools of four, in which teams played home and away matches against each other. The pool winners and two best runners-up qualified for the knock-out stages. Leicester Tigers won the cup, securing back-to-back titles and a third straight victory for the club.

Teams

Pool stage
In the pool matches teams received
 2 points for a win
 1 points for a draw

Pool 1

Pool 2

Pool 3

Pool 4

Pool 5

Pool 6

Seeding

Knockout stage

Quarter-finals

Semi-finals

Final

The Leicester Tigers became the first team to win the competition more than once.

References

 
2001–02
2001–02 rugby union tournaments for clubs
2001–02 in European rugby union
2001–02 in English rugby union
2001–02 in French rugby union
2001–02 in Irish rugby union
2001–02 in Italian rugby union
2001–02 in Scottish rugby union
2001–02 in Welsh rugby union